The title Aleqa ("Master", also transliterated Alaqa) is a honorific title used in the Ethiopian Orthodox Tewahedo Church.  It is used as the title of a chief priest of a major church, the head of a monastery, as well as being an honorific for a highly educated member of the church, especially in the case of dabtaras.

An Alaqa is responsible for maintaining order in the church, as well as the administration.

References

"The Resilient Nature of Common Property Resource Management Systems: a case study from the Guassa area of Menz, Ethiopia" by Zelealem Tefera Ashenafi and N. Leader-Williams (Presented at "Survival of the Commons: Mounting Challenges and New Realities," the Eleventh Conference of the International Association for the Study of Common Property, Bali, Indonesia, 19 June–23 June 2006) [PDF]

Eastern Christianity in Ethiopia
Ecclesiastical titles